New Rochester is an unincorporated community in Paulding County, Ohio, United States. New Rochester is located along the northern border of Cecil.

New Rochester was the first county seat of Paulding County from 1839 for a little more than a year.

In 1839-40 there were about 30 to 40 families and three general stores. There was daily stage service to Toledo and Fort Wayne. Three hotels and two blacksmiths serviced the stage and residents. There is no trace left of New Rochester but a monument ("1835 - 1935") and two cemeteries.

References

Unincorporated communities in Paulding County, Ohio
Unincorporated communities in Ohio